Abd al-Wahhab Hawmad  (1915 – February 2002) was a Syrian politician, lawyer, criminologist and professor.

Background
Hawmad was born to father Mahmoud Hawmad in Aleppo, where he was raised, in 1915. Before his entry into politics, Hawmad worked as a lawyer, specializing in criminology. He graduated from the University of Paris with a law doctorate and a degree in criminal justice. He also studied Arabic literature at the university. When he returned to Syria, Hawmad also worked as a professor at the University of Damascus.

Political career

People's Party
He became a founding member of the People's Party, part of its left-wing faction, in 1947, one year after Syria's independence from the French Mandate. The party's platform revolved around strengthening Syrian democracy, distributing political power—which was largely concentrated in the hands of Damascus-based politicians—throughout the country, and uniting with neighboring Iraq. It was allied and financed by the Hashemites, who were in power in both Iraq and Jordan. That same year, Hawmad won a seat representing Aleppo in the Parliament of Syria, which he kept until 1951. He won a seat at the Constitutional Assembly and took part in writing Syria's 1949 constitution. President Hashim al-Atasi subsequently rewarded Hawmad with the Syrian Republic Medal of Honor for Excellence, in recognition of his efforts.

After leaving Parliament, he was appointed education minister in Prime Minister Hasan al-Hakim's government. As education minister, Hawmad launched the largest foreign scholarship program in Syrian history, sending 300 students to the American and European universities. President Adib al-Shishakli, who came to power through military coup, had Hawmad arrested for his party's views, as part of a larger campaign to stem domestic dissent in the country. When Shishakli fled the country in February 1954, Hawmad was released.

Between September 1955 and June 1956, Hawmad served as finance minister in Prime Minister Said al-Ghazzi's cabinet, while in Prime Minister Sabri al-Asali's cabinet, between June and December 1956, he served as education minister. Along with Ma'rouf al-Dawalibi, Faydi al-Atasi and Ahmad Qanbar, Hawmad advocated that the nominally pro-Western party adopt neutralism in the Cold War, so as not to jeopardize Syrian relations with the Soviet Union. Together, they succeeded in preventing the ruling People's Party from aligning with the pro-Western camp.

Nasserism
In the late 1950s, Hawmad became a devoted Nasserist, a supporter of Egyptian President Gamal Abdel Nasser's pan-Arab leadership. This was a shift from his previous support for the Hashemites, Nasser's main Arab rivals at the time. He supported the union of Syria and Egypt into the United Arab Republic (UAR) in 1958, and became the only member of the People's Party (all parties were dissolved following the union's establishment) to serve in the UAR's Northern Region (Syrian) cabinet. On 16 August he was appointed Minister of State for Planning and was based in Cairo.

He returned to Damascus on 23 October 1961 following the UAR's dissolution. His former part colleague Nazim al-Qudsi became president following the Syrian coup that terminated the UAR. Hawmad did not rejoin the People's Party and opposed the secessionist government, openly calling for the UAR's reestablishment. Together with Nahid al-Qasim, a former colleague associated with the People's Party who also served in the UAR government, he founded the United Arab Front, one of a number of Nasserist parties that emerged after the secession. In 1962, unidentified assassins led an unsuccessful attempt to kill Hawmad by rigging his automobile with explosives.

On 8 March 1963, a coalition of Baʻthist, Nasserist and independent Arab nationalist officers launched a coup, overthrowing Qudsi's government. The new prime minister Salah al-Din al-Bitar, a Baʻthist, appointed Hawmad and Qasim to his cabinet. Hawmad served as finance minister. However, when the Baʻthist-dominated Military Committee—the secretive junta that virtually controlled Syria—purged dozens of Nasserists from the officer corps in April and May, Hawmad and four other Nasserist ministers resigned from their posts.

Later life and death
After his resignation, Hawmad remained in Syria, continuing his law practice as well as his professorship at the University of Damascus. He was elected to the Arabic Language Assemblage, which is the "highest international scientific authority in the field of Arab language and literature", according to Sami Moubayed, in 1991. He oversaw academic research from Syria and was an active member of the organization until he died in February 2002.

References

Bibliography

1915 births
2002 deaths
Criminologists
Academic staff of Damascus University
Syrian Arab nationalists
20th-century Syrian lawyers
Syrian ministers of education
Syrian ministers of finance
People from Aleppo
People's Party (Syria) politicians
University of Paris alumni